Harogeri is a village in Dharwad district of Karnataka, India.

Demographics 
As of the 2011 Census of India there were 122 households in Harogeri and a total population of 603 consisting of 305 males and 298 females. There were 104 children ages 0-6.

References

Villages in Dharwad district